This is a timeline of Artsakh's history, representing territorial control under three columns:

 RealmThe highest level of authority.
 StateThe state or administrative unit that the region of Artsakh belonged to.
 ArtsakhGeopolitical entity in Artsakh proper (Mountainous Karabakh).

See also 
 Timeline of Armenian history
 Timeline of modern Armenian history

Notes

References 

Republic of Artsakh
Nagorno-Karabakh